Tobias Weis (born 30 July 1985) is a German retired footballer.

Club career
Weis began his career 1990 with SC Bibersfeld and joined after three years in summer 1993 to Sportfreunde Schwäbisch Hall. He played for SF Schwäbisch Hall until July 1996 here was scouted from VfB Stuttgart, after eight years on youth side was promoted to the reserve team. Weis played three seasons with VfB Stuttgart II in the Regionalliga Süd, before moving to Hoffenheim in July 2007.

For Hoffenheim, Eintracht Frankfurt and VfL Bochum Weis played almost 130 matches in the top two levels of the German league pyramid.

International career
Weis got his first call up to the German national team for a friendly against England in late 2008. He played his first match for Germany in a friendly against United Arab Emirates on 2 June 2009. He was substituted on in the 66th minute for Thomas Hitzlsperger. No other cap was later won so this match was his only appearance for the Mannschaft.

Career statistics

References

External links
 
 
 
 

1985 births
Living people
People from Schwäbisch Hall
Sportspeople from Stuttgart (region)
German footballers
Footballers from Baden-Württemberg
TSG 1899 Hoffenheim players
TSG 1899 Hoffenheim II players
VfB Stuttgart II players
Eintracht Frankfurt players
VfL Bochum players
VfL Bochum II players
Bundesliga players
2. Bundesliga players
Germany international footballers
Association football midfielders